Ronald Lee Drake (born September 26, 1937) is an American politician from the state of Indiana. He served in the Indiana House of Representatives for two terms from 1963 to 1967.

References

External links

Living people
1937 births
Democratic Party members of the Indiana House of Representatives